The Women's Auxiliary Australian Air Force  (WAAAF) was formed in March 1941 after considerable lobbying by women keen to serve, as well as by the Chief of the Air Staff, who wanted to release male personnel serving in Australia for service overseas. The WAAAF was the first and largest of the wartime Australian women's services. It was disbanded in December 1947.

History 

Not long after World War II was declared in 1939, the Royal Australian Air Force had an urgent need for more skilled and semi-skilled signals and maintenance personnel to fulfil its wartime commitments to the Empire Air Training Scheme (EATS) for local defence in Australia.

On 4 February 1941, the formation of an air force women's auxiliary was approved by the War Cabinet. It had taken 14 months of difficult discussion and opposition to achieve this final outcome.

The formation of the Women's Auxiliary Australian Air Force (WAAAF) set a precedent for the formation of other women's service organisations such as The Australian Women's Army Service (AWAS) and the Women's Royal Australian Naval Service (WRANS).

Approximately 27,000 women enlisted in the WAAAF between 15 March 1941 and 24 August 1945. In June 1941, Squadron Officer Clare Stevenson was appointed Director of the WAAAF. She took over from Flight Officer Mary Bell, wife of an RAAF group captain and former Australian Commandant of the volunteer Women's Air Training Corps, who had held temporary command for the first three months of the WAAAF's existence.

See also 

 Women in World War II
 Women's Auxiliary Air Force – UK example established 1939
 Australian women during World War II
 Australian Women's Land Army
 Australian Women's Army Service
 Women's Royal Australian Naval Service
 Royal Australian Naval Nursing Service
 Royal Australian Air Force Nursing Service
 Women in warfare and the military (1945–99)
 Women's Royal Australian Air Force

References 

Royal Australian Air Force
Military units and formations established in 1941
Military units and formations disestablished in 1947
Military units and formations of the Royal Australian Air Force in World War II
History of Australia (1901–1945)
Air
All-female military units and formations